Winter Dreams is a one-act ballet choreographed by Kenneth MacMillan to piano pieces by Pyotr Ilyich Tchaikovsky selected and arranged by Philip Gammon and traditional Russian music selected and arranged for guitar and mandolin ensemble by Thomas Hartman. With scenery and costumes designed by Peer Farmer and lighting designed by Clive Thomas, it was first presented by The Royal Ballet at the Royal Opera House, London, on 7 February 1991.

Background
Macmillan's ballet was inspired by Anton Chekhov's play Three Sisters (1900), sometimes named as one of his four best plays, along with The Cherry Orchard, The Seagull, and Uncle Vanya. First performed in 1901 at the Moscow Art Theater, it concerns the intricate relationships of three sisters marooned in the stultifying atmosphere of a provincial Russian garrison town at the turn of the twentieth century. They all have "winter dreams" of returning to Moscow, where they imagine that their lives would be more interesting and fulfilling.

The action in the ballet does not mirror all the events and incidents in the play. MacMillan noted that "Although the characters in the ballet are named after those in the play, I have not attempted a balletic reworking of the whole story. Sometimes the choreography reflects the inner life of the characters, at other times the narrative. I have tried to capture the atmosphere and melancholy of Chekov's masterpiece."

Scenario
Olga, the eldest of the three sisters, is the matriarchal figure of the Prozorov family, though she is still a young woman. She has given up hope of marriage and has dedicated herself to the exhausting life of a high-school teacher. Masha, the middle sister, finds herself trapped in an unbearable marriage to a boring schoolmaster. She falls passionately in love, for the first time, with the idealistic Colonel Vershinin, the commander of the local army garrison. They begin a clandestine affair. When he is transferred away, she is crushed but returns to life with her forgiving husband. Irina, the youngest sister, has a romantic view of life. While longing for the excitement of Moscow, she works in a dreary job with the local town council. Just as she is about to escape to a marriage of convenience with Baron Tesenbach, he is killed in a duel with a rival suitor. The sisters' brother, Andrey, is married to Natasha, a social climber who has ambitions of taking over the family home. Observing the passions and disappointments of them all are Doctor Chebutykin, a family friend, and Anfisa, the sisters' former nanny.

Original cast
 Darcey Bussell – Masha Kulgina, the middle sister
 Nicola Tranah – Olga Prosorova, the eldest sister
 Viviana Durante – Irina Prosorova, the youngest sister
 Gary Avis – Andrey Prosorov, their brother
 Genesia Rosato – Natasha Prosorova, Andrey's wife
 Anthony Dowell – Fyodor Kulygin, Masha's husband
 Irek Mukhamedov – Lieutenant Colonel Vershinin, Masha's lover
 Stephen Wicks – Lieutenant the Baron Tusenbach, Irina's fiancé
 Adam Cooper – Captain Solyony, a rival suitor
 Derek Rencher – Doctor Chebutykin, an army doctor
 Gerd Larsen – Anfisa, elderly family retainer and former nurse
 Jacqui Tallis – Maid
 Luke Hayden, Philip Mosley, David Pickering, Alistair Marriott – Soldiers

Digital video disc
A performance by the original cast can be seen on a DVD distributed by Kultur International Films Ltd. Produced and directed for BBC Television by Derek Bailey, it was recorded at the Royal Opera House, Covent Garden, in 1990.

References

Ballets by Kenneth MacMillan
Ballets to the music of Pyotr Ilyich Tchaikovsky
1991 ballet premieres